"Morning Glory" is Bonnie Pink's second digital single. The single was released under the Warner Music Japan label on January 11, 2010.

Track listing

Charts

References

External links
Bonnie Pink's Official Website

2010 singles
2010 songs
Bonnie Pink songs
Warner Music Japan singles
Songs written by Bonnie Pink